Mighty Atom Records is a Welsh based record label.  The company was formed in early 2000 by Dave Simpson and Roger Hopkins. It is known for having been one of a few independent record labels at the forefront of the UK emo scene in the early 2000s, due to its early involvement with Funeral for a Friend.

It operates out of the former BBC buildings in Swansea, Wales.

The label ran into financial difficulties as the years progressed and although still a functioning label, have not released any material since Brigade in 2006. The Mighty Atom recording facility 'Mighty Atom Studios' still operates out of Wales, and has recorded the majority of the bands and records released on the label.

Notable bands on its past and present roster are: 
 Funeral for a Friend 
 3 Colours Red 
 Hondo Maclean 
 Brigade 
 Bassknives
 Aconite Thrill
 Hollywood Ending
 The Lucky Nine
 Liberty 37
 Goatboy
 Days in December

Notable bands recorded at Mighty Atom are:
 Funeral for a Friend
 Brigade
 Gypsy Pistoleros
 Taint
 3 Colours Red
 Hollywood ending
 Million Dead
 Sizen
 The lucidia console
 Johnny Truant

See also
 List of record labels

External links

Record labels established in 2000
British independent record labels
Alternative rock record labels